J.-Wilfrid Dufresne (5 August 1911 – 30 June 1982) was a Progressive Conservative party member of the House of Commons of Canada. Born in Quebec City, Quebec, he held various other jobs such as interior decorator, promoter, teacher, a Quebec provincial public servant, a federal statistician for the Minimum Wages Commission.

Dufresne attended schools at the Saint-Sauveur orphanage, Saint-Sauveur Academy and St. Mary's College.

He was elected to Parliament at the Quebec West riding in the 1953 general election as a Progressive Conservative, defeating Liberal party incumbent Charles Parent. Dufresne served only one term in Parliament before Liberal René Bégin won the riding back in the 1957 election. His next attempt to win a House of Commons seat was made in the 1972 election where he was a Social Credit candidate at Langelier riding, but was unable to unseat incumbent Jean Marchand. His last federal campaign was in the 1979 election at Québec-Est where he returned to the Progressive Conservative party, but was again unsuccessful.

Electoral record

References

External links
 

1911 births
1982 deaths
Canadian schoolteachers
Members of the House of Commons of Canada from Quebec
Politicians from Quebec City
Progressive Conservative Party of Canada MPs